Velter is a surname. Notable people with the surname include:

André Velter (born 1945), French poet
Michael Velter (born 1980), Belgian triple jumper
Robert Velter (1909–1991), French cartoonist

See also
Selter (disambiguation)
Vetter